Al-Horgelah Sports Club is a Syrian professional football club based in Al-Horjelah, Rif Dimashq Governorate. It was founded in 2015. They play their home games at the Municipal Stadium in Al-Horjelah, and Al-Jalaa Stadium in Damascus.

History
Al-Horgelah Sports Club were promoted to the Syrian Premier League for the 2020–21 season for the first time in their history; hence, they became the first club from the Rif Dimashq Governorate to play in the Syrian Premier League. In their first season in the Syrian Premier League, they acquired Syrian coach Fajr Ibrahim and national goalkeeper Ibrahim Alma.

References

Al-Horgelah
Association football clubs established in 2015
2015 establishments in Syria